Simon Davidson (born 14 May 1970) is an Israeli politician who currently serves as a member of the Knesset for Yesh Atid. In the past he was chairman of the Israel Swimming Association.

Biography
Davidson was born in Vilnius in the Lithuanian SSR of the Soviet Union in 1970. Two years later his family immigrated to Israel. After completing his national service in the Israel Defense Forces he earned a bachelor's degree in education.

A swimmer, Davidson became a senior swimming coach. In 2016 he was appointed chairman of the Israel Swimming Association, and also became a member of the Olympic Committee of Israel.

Entering politics, Davidson joined the Yesh Atid party and was placed twenty-second on its list for the March 2021 Knesset elections. Although the party won only seventeen seats, he entered the Knesset in July 2021 as a replacement for Idan Roll, who resigned his seat under the Norwegian law after being appointed Deputy Minister of Foreign Affairs.

References

External links

1970 births
Living people
Israeli Jews
Israeli male swimmers
Israeli people of Lithuanian-Jewish descent
Israeli sports executives and administrators
Israeli swimming coaches
Jewish Israeli politicians
Jewish Israeli sportspeople
Lithuanian Jews
Members of the 24th Knesset (2021–2022)
Members of the 25th Knesset (2022–)
Politicians from Vilnius
Soviet emigrants to Israel
Soviet Jews
Yesh Atid politicians